Valets Lake is a freshwater body that straddles Valets and Girouard Townships in Senneterre in La Vallée-de-l'Or Regional County Municipality (RCM), in the administrative region of Abitibi-Témiscamingue, in province of Quebec, in Canada.

Forestry is the main economic activity of the sector; recreational tourism activities come second. Its surface is generally frozen from the beginning of December to the end of April.

The hydrographic slope of lake Valets is mainly served by a forest road that goes north between the Capousacataca River and lake Valets.

Geography 
This  lake has two parts to the north and a long bay extending southward . This body of water is relatively parallel and on the west side of the Capousacataca River.

Lake Valets obtains supplies from the east side by the outlet of Lakes Adjutor and Robitaille; and on the west side by the Bird Lake outlet, BC Creek, draining a set of lakes including Kâwininonamebanekak and Kâpiskagamak, the Kâmakabosikak Lake outlet and Kâkiyâckowok stream draining a series of lakes including Tuillé, Wiashgamic and Joe.

The main hydrographic slopes near Lac Valets are:
North side: Capousacataca River, Wetetnagami River, Lecompte River;
East side: Capousacataca River, Mégiscane River;
South side: Jim Creek, Mégiscane River, Faillon Lake;
West side: Collin River, Delestres River, Lecompte River.

Lake Valets flows to the bottom of a bay to the northeast in the Capousacataca River.

Toponymy
The name "Lac Valets" was officialized on December 5, 1968 by the Commission de toponymie du Québec when it was created.

Notes and references

See also 

La Vallée-de-l’Or
Lakes of Abitibi-Témiscamingue
Nottaway River drainage basin